Zeytuntsyan is an Armenian surname likely originating from the Mediterranean region. The prefix, Zeytun-, means "olive" in some languages (Spanish: aceituna; Arabic: zeitun), it is also the name of an Armenian township in historic Western Armenia in the Northeastern Mediterranean Basin.

The town name of Zeytun, or the surname Zeytuntsyan independently, is likely related to the indigenous growth of olive trees in the Mediterranean Basin. The surname may be topographic (referring to the land features themselves), occupational (referring to the cultivation of olives), or local (referring to residency in the township).

Notable people sharing the surname Zeytuntsyan
 Perch Zeytuntsyan (born 1938) Armenian playwright, screenwriter, former Minister of Culture of Armenia

See also 
Süleymanlı
Mediterranean Basin
Old World

External links 
 Zeytun Culture Center

References
Armenian Names Database "ZEYTUN"

Armenian culture